Duteil is a surname. Notable people with the surname include:

 Francis Duteil (1947–2016), French cyclist
 Sidney Duteil (born 1955), French musician and television and radio host
 Yves Duteil (born 1949), French singer-songwriter